Dança dos Escravos (Portuguese for "Dance of the Slaves") is a solo album by Brazilian composer and guitarist Egberto Gismonti recorded in 1988 and released on the ECM label.

Reception
The Allmusic review awarded the album 4½ stars.

Track listing
All compositions by Egberto Gismonti except as indicated:

 2 Violões - 5:58
 Lundu - 6:30
 Trenzinho do Caipira (Heitor Villa-Lobos) - 7:18
 Alegrinho - 3:44
 Dança dos Escravos - 14:58
 Salvador - 4:45
 Memória e Fado - 3:22

Personnel
 Egberto Gismonti - guitar

References

1989 albums
ECM Records albums
Albums produced by Manfred Eicher
Egberto Gismonti albums